Eurosia punctitermia is a moth of the family Erebidae. It was described by George Hampson in 1900. It is found on Bali.

References

Nudariina
Moths described in 1900